The Bride in Black is a 1990 American television film directed by James Goldstone and starring Susan Lucci, David Soul and Reginald VelJohnson.

Cast
Susan Lucci as Rose D`Amore
David Soul as Owen Malloy
Reginald VelJohnson as Barry Gates
Finola Hughes as Cybil Cobb
Melissa Leo as Mary Margaret
Tony Todd as 747 Green
Bob Gunton as Sydney

Production
The film was shot in Pittsburgh.

Reception
Ken Tucker of Entertainment Weekly graded the film a D.

References

External links
 

1990 television films
1990 films
American television films
1990s English-language films
Films directed by James Goldstone
American Broadcasting Company original programming
American Broadcasting Company television specials
Films shot in Pittsburgh